Adam Blackwell was a Canadian diplomat. He served as the Secretary of Multidimensional Security at the Organization of American States (OAS).
He was  Ambassador of Canada to the Dominican Republic from 2002  to 2005.

Career
Blackwell said he and Archbishop Romulo Emiliani were influential in stopping gang violence in Honduras.
Also, he said "responses to crime and violence should be long-term actions to address their underlying causes" in a speech "at the opening ceremony of the Organisation of American States/Inter-American Drug Abuse Commission's (CICAD) First Regional Meeting - Caribbean Training and Certification Programme for Drug Prevention and Treatment Personnel."

Honours
Blackwell was awarded the Grand Cross with Silver Breast Star of the Order of Merit of Duarte, Sánchez and Mella by the president of the Dominican Republic.

References

Canadian diplomats
Living people
Ambassadors of Canada to the Dominican Republic
Grand Crosses with Silver Breast Star of the Order of Merit of Duarte, Sánchez and Mella
Year of birth missing (living people)